Peter Emil Becker (23 November 1908 – 7 October 2000) was a German neurologist, psychiatrist and geneticist. He is remembered for his studies of muscular dystrophies. Becker's muscular dystrophy (OMIM 300376) and Becker myotonia (OMIM 255700) are named after him. Since 1998, the Gesellschaft für Neuropädiatrie (GNP) grants Peter-Emil-Becker-Preis for special achievements in the field of child neurology.

He studied medicine in Marburg, Berlin, Munich, Vienna and Hamburg, graduating in 1933. Afterwards he trained in neurology and psychiatry in Hamburg and Freiburg. Between 1934 and 1936 he was attached to the Kaiser Wilhelm Institute of Anthropology, Human Heredity, and Eugenics (KWI-A), working under the guidance of Eugen Fischer.  While at the KWI-A, Becker also worked with the prominent geneticist, eugenics specialist, and Nazi Party member Dr. Fritz Lenz.

Becker was a member of the SA (Sturmabteilung) since 1934, and in 1940 he joined the Nazi Party.  After the war he was dismissed from the University of Freiburg because of the membership in these organisations; however, in 1947 he was formally de-Nazified and has obtained venia legendi at the University of Freiburg. In 1957 he was appointed professor of human genetics at the University of Göttingen, the post he held until his retirement in 1975.

References

German geneticists
German neurologists
German psychiatrists
1908 births
2000 deaths
People associated with the Kaiser Wilhelm Institute of Anthropology, Human Heredity, and Eugenics
20th-century German physicians